Owodog is a member of Lollipop F, a Taiwanese Mandopop boyband currently signed under the label Gold Typhoon (formerly EMI Capitol).  The group consists of six members, all chosen in 2006 from Channel [V] Taiwan's show 模范棒棒堂 (Bang Bang Tang, or BBT), a show which sought to create new male artists in the entertainment business of Taiwan. Since then, Owodog has debuted as a singer, a host, an actor, and a short film director and has contributed three lyrics to the group's albums to date.

Biography

Background
Owodog was born on October 30, 1984 in Taiwan, and his family consists of his parents and an older sister. Originally from Taichung, Owodog moved to Taipei when attending Takming University of Science and Technology, where he met Liljay. Since becoming members of Lollipop, they have transferred to Hsing Wu College. He currently lives with other members of the group in an apartment rented to them by BBT show host FanFan in Taipei, having moved several times since their debut.

Owodog, along with Liljay and A-Wei are members of Taiwanese breakdance group Black Angle Crew. Shortly after Owodog and Liljay joined Bang Bang Tang, the crew performed at 我愛黑澀會, the female version of BBT that debuted a year earlier on Channel V.

In 2006, Owodog became among the first group of boys to be selected into Bang Bang Tang after auditioning for the show in Taipei with Liljay. The show would officially debut on August 17, 2006, and he would be selected to act as the class leader in the show. For all three of the elimination contests before the selection, Owodog received first place. For one of these performances, he collaborated with Liljay.

The formation of Lollipop
On November 27, 2006, the episode in which the six members of the group were selected and revealed was aired. The order in which the members were announced is as follows: Liljay, Prince, Owodog, Fabien, William, and A-Wei. The members signed a contract to Channel V, and Dora Ao became their agent. The group, named Lollipop, then officially signed a contract with EMI Capitol on December 2, 2006. Owodog, being the leader in BBT, was named the group leader as well. On December 9, 2006, Lollipop made its first public performance as a group at the V-Power Music Storm Concert.

Lollipop first EP Colorful Lollipop was released on January 26, 2007, with six different covers, each featuring a member of the group. Four months later, on May 25, a second EP titled Summer's First Experience was released along with a photobook compiled with photos taken in Okinawa, as well as a DVD.

2007-2008

Acting and hosting debut
During the summer of 2007, members of Lollipop made their acting debut in the drama Brown Sugar Macchiato, a collaboration with Hey Girl, in which, Owodog acted as the oldest brother in the family. Because of the large number of main characters, fifteen in total, and the many obligations both groups had apart from the drama, the original director quit after directing five episodes. Nevertheless, the first episode was aired in Taiwan on July 15, 2007. Later, Lollipop admits on Kangsi Coming that the drama had been more of an introduction of the two groups instead of a major acting challenge, as the members were told to act like themselves, and that many subplots were explained only briefly due to the large number of main characters. After thirteen episodes, the drama ended on October 7, 2007. Additionally, an official soundtrack was released with songs from Lollipop and Hey Girl. 

The same year, Lollipop began hosting their own show Lollipop Gyashan (LOLLIPOP哪裡怕) on October 27 until April 19, 2008, when the show stopped airing.

Official debut album and concert
Lollipop's debut album Gyashan was released on December 28, 2007.  Gyashan entered Mandarin charts in the number one position, outselling F4's album Waiting for You – Await Your Love (在這裡等你) released the same day.

On January 26, 2008, a year after the release of their first EP, Lollipop held its debut concert at the Taipei Arena. 
The concert DVD was released on June 6, 2008, breaking chart records with sales rates of more than 35%. The DVD has topped the charts for a period of one month since. Due to copyright issues, Owodog's tribute to Michael Jackson could not be included in the DVD, but was aired on Bang Bang Tang.–

2008–2009

Graduation from Bang Bang Tang
Lollipop had been appearing regularly on Bang Bang Tang  since August 14, 2006. With Channel [V]'s decision to select a new batch of boys and create a second season, Owodog and most of the other members "graduated" from Bang Bang Tang. For his last performance, another tribute to Michael Jackson's Ghost and a collaboration with members of 我愛黑澀會, Owodog received first place. Their last official episode aired on August 29, 2008, marking the end of the first season. In total, the members of Lollipop had participated in more than 500 episodes of the show. Since the start of Bang Bang Tang II, Owodog had, on several occasions, returned to the show as a guest or a co-host.

Drama, hosting, film, and other performing opportunities

Owodog guest starred in the dramaThe Legend of Brown Sugar Chivalries, which starred other members of Lollipop and Hey Girl that had debuted July 26, 2008 on Star TV Chinese Channel. On October 3, 2008, the original soundtrack was released by Gold Typhoon.

At the same time, he also began hosting Na Li Wu Da Kang (哪裡5打坑) with Liljay, Awei, Hey Girl's Apple, and Channel V's VJ Rong Jia. The show has ended around December 2008.

Having performed in Singapore a week before, the group returned to Taiwan to participate in the 2008 V-Power Love Music Concert on November 29, 2008. The concert united Liljay, Owodog, and A-wei with other Black Angle Crew members for a dance performance. Together, the six members of Lollipop performed five songs. Lollipop's participation in the concert also marks, symbolically, the two-year anniversary of the group's formation.

A week later, on December 6, 2008, Lollipop performed four songs with themes of wushu at the 45th Golden Horse Awards ceremony.

After talks with Paco Wong in 2008, the chairman of Gold Records, Owodog is starring in a kung fu film called Hot-blooded Union (熱血同盟) with Theresa Fu and a member of The Flowers. The film has started filming near the end of 2008 in Beijing. Later news also reveal that A-Wei, who impressed the director with his wushu skills, has been invited to guest star in the film. The name of the film has since been changed to Martial Spirit (武動青春), and a trailer was shown at Lollipop's I am Legend concert in Hong Kong.

As one of Channel [V]'s Chinese New Year programs, a short film called 狼牙棒 aired on January 26, 2009. The short film is produced by Owodog, along with bandmates William and A-Wei, starring also in the film themselves.

Bang Bang Tang III
In February, 2009, Channel [V] began filming its revamped version and new season of Bang Bang Tang, which marked the return of several members from the first season, including Owodog. For the new season, Owodog shot and directed a promotional ad of members dancing at several sites in Taipei with Aben of Choc7. Bang Bang Tang III began airing on March 2, 2009, with Show Lo being the first guest star.
In 2009, Lollipop, as a group, made its first lyric contributions to other artists, which are included in the mini album of the group Choc7, composed of seven members selected from the same show.

2009–Present

I am Legend: Second album and Asia tour
Lollipop's second album I am Legend is released on June 19, 2009. For the album, Owodog wrote the lyrics to the song "綜藝咖" and co-wrote the lyrics for the title song "I am Legend" with Prince, as well as, "One Way" with Liljay. A concert tour in Asia with the same name as the album commenced in Hong Kong Coliseum on July 4 and July 5, 2009.

While promoting I am Legend on several Taiwanese variety shows, including Kangxi Lai Le, 100% Entertainment, Azio Superstar, etc., Owodog and other members of Lollipop, created a series of dance performances specifically for the show hosts of each show, thus completing a mini TV tour.

End of Bang Bang Tang 
With show host FanFan leaving the show to focus on her musical career, Bang Bang Tang'''s last episode was aired on July 30, 2009. This marks the end of Owodog's participation in the show.

 Call Me By Fire 
In 2021, he joined the cast of Call Me By Fire as a contestant. He was subsequently eliminated in episode 9.

Discography

Albums

EPs

Original soundtracks

Concert DVDs

Lyrics contributions

Filmography

Television series

Films

Short filmsThis table includes short films that are directed and produced by members of Lollipop, which were aired on Channel [V] independently (i.e. not as part of the show Bang Bang Tang).

Variety shows

Concert appearances
This list does not include year-end galas or autograph/performance sessions.

Lollipop's concerts

Appearances as guests

Other concerts
This table consists of concerts where Lollipop is one of many artists who performed.

Endorsements/Commercial appearances

Awards
Awards received as part of Lollipop.

See also
Lollipop
 Channel [V] Taiwan
 Bang Bang Tang

References

External links
 Owodog's official Facebook Fanpage
 Owodog's Wretch blog
 Lollipop F's official page on Gold Typhoon
 Lollipop F's official website and fan club

1982 births
Living people
Taiwanese male film actors
Taiwanese male dancers
Taiwanese Mandopop singers
Taiwanese male television actors
Male actors from Taichung
21st-century Taiwanese singers
Musicians from Taichung